Saint-Denis-des-Murs is a commune in the Haute-Vienne department in the Nouvelle-Aquitaine region in west-central France. It is situated in the Limousin region (now part of the Nouvelle-Aquitaine region), in the southern-centre of France at 24 kilometres from Limoges, the department capital (general information: Saint-Denis-Des-Murs is 347 kilometres from Paris).

Popular places to visit nearby include Saint-Leonard-de-Noblat at 7 km and Pierre-Buffiere at 17 km.

See also
Communes of the Haute-Vienne department
Saint-Léonard-de-Noblat

References

Communes of Haute-Vienne
Lemovices